West Florida High School of Advanced Technology is a magnet high school located in Pensacola, Florida. It is part of the Escambia County School District.

West Florida High School of Advanced Technology opened in August 2001 with 324 ninth graders. Today, the enrollment is 1,280 students, ninth through twelfth grade.

Technical fields
 Academy of Information Technology
 Aerospace Engineering
 Agriscience Technology
 Biomedical Sciences
 Civil Engineering and Architecture
 Cox Telecommunications
 Criminal Justice
 Critical Care & Emergency Medicine
 Energy Academy
 Multimedia
 Pre-Professional Nursing
 Sports Medicine

WFHS is on a modified block schedule.  On even calendar days, even numbered classes meet.  On odd calendar days, odd numbered classes meet.  The one exception is that 7th period meets every day for a shorter amount of time.

Seniors may elect to participate in the A.C.E. program, which allows students to get on the job training while getting paid by participating in internships.

Capstone
Each student completes a Capstone project—a display of comprehension and mastery of a given field that focuses on a field-related topic.

The project is separated into three parts:
 technical paper 
 product or project-related community service 
 presentation with visual aides

This Capstone project is completed during the 11th grade year only.

Athletics
West Florida High provides many sports such as football, volleyball, baseball, cheerleading, softball, cross-country, track and field, basketball, soccer, swimming, weightlifting, lacrosse, tennis and golf. With the first new sport addition in the last few years, lacrosse has been made an official sport for both boys and girls in the 2014–2015 school year.

The West Florida softball team brought the school its first team state championship in the 2013–2014 year.

In the 2011 - 2012 year, the Jaguars Freshman football team went 9–1, claiming the district championship.

The 2013 - 2014 team fell just short of another district championship. After being ranked No. 1 in the state for a few weeks to start the season, the team lost to the then No. 2 ranked Catholic High. They still made the playoffs, but they were thwarted by Catholic again with an overtime loss in the second round of the playoffs. They did beat Tallahassee Godby in the first round, which was a major accomplishment considering the fact that Godby had knocked them out of the playoffs the previous two years.
In the 2016 - 2017 school year, the Freshman and Junior Varsity football teams went undefeated, along with a 6–2 record for Varsity.

Girls' soccer has also won consecutive district titles in 2012 and 2013.

Boys' soccer won its first district championship in 2018 after defeating Choctawhatchee 2–0 in the District 1-3A Championship game. West Florida also knocked off #2 in the state Gulf Breeze High School in the district semifinal with a score of 2–0, and Pensacola High 5–0 in the opening round of the tournament.

Arts and other activities

WFHS also added a marching band for the 2010–2011 school year. Known as the Sound of the Jags, they are now led by Justin Mozina.

During 2007–2008, in only its ninth year in existence, WFHS served as the President school of the Florida Association of Student Councils. Since then, the Student Government Association has earned a Gold Medallion every year. The organization's main project for 2016–2017 involves a local nursing home, Bayside Manor. All SGA members volunteer there for four hours per nine weeks.

Online presence

West Florida High School's Student Government Association (SGA) hosts an Instagram and Twitter page to "update and notify students of current/future school news and events." Similarly, yearbook club spreads information relating to yearbook orders and pickup via their Instagram page. Other arts courses, sports teams, and clubs use social media, including Key Club, HOSA Club, volleyball, soccer, lacrosse, basketball, and more.

References

External links

Escambia County School District
High schools in Escambia County, Florida
Educational institutions established in 2001
Public high schools in Florida
Magnet schools in Florida
2001 establishments in Florida